The 1970 Australian Drivers' Championship was a CAMS sanctioned motor racing title for drivers of  Australian Formula 1  and  Australian Formula 2 racing cars. The winner of the title, which was the fourteenth Australian Drivers' Championship, was awarded the 1970 CAMS Gold Star.

The championship was won by Leo Geoghegan driving a Lotus 39 Repco and a Lotus 59B Waggott.

Calendar
The championship was contested over six rounds with one race per round.

Points system
Championship points were awarded on a 9-6-4-3-2-1 basis to the first six finishers in each round. Only the best five round results could be retained by each driver.

Results

Note: There were only five classified finishers at the Mallala round.

Notes and references

Further reading
 Australian Motor Racing Annual 1971
 Program for Mallala Races, 12 October 1970
 Super Sandown, Racing Car News, October 1970

External links
 Open wheelers 1970, autopics.com.au

Australian Drivers' Championship
Drivers' Championship